Caseasauria is one of the two main clades of early synapsids, the other being the Eupelycosauria.  Caseasaurs are currently known only from the Late Carboniferous and the Permian, and include two superficially different families, the small insectivorous or carnivorous Eothyrididae, and the large, herbivorous Caseidae. These two groups share a number of specialised features associated with the morphology of the snout and external naris.

The ancestor of caseasaurs can be traced back to an insect eating or an omnivorous reptile-like synapsid from the Pennsylvanian time of the Carboniferous, possibly resembling Archaeothyris, the earliest known synapsid. The caseasaurs were abundant during the later part of the Early Permian, but by the Middle Permian caseasaur diversity declined because the group was outcompeted by the more successful therapsids. The last caseasaurs became extinct at the end of the Guadelupian (Middle Permian).

Description

Among the most conspicuous characteristics uniting caseasaurs are an enlarged nostril and a snout tip that overhangs the tooth row.

Early caseasaurs, including all eothyridids, were relatively small animals. However, most caseids reached larger sizes, and some caseids, such as Cotylorhynchus and Alierasaurus, were among the largest terrestrial animals of the early Permian.

Evolution
Caseasaurs first appear in the fossil record in the late Carboniferous, alongside many other early amniote groups. The earliest known synapsid, Asaphestera from the Bashkirian age, may be an eothyridid caseasaur. The earliest definitive caseasaur is Eocasea.

Caseids thrived during the Kungurian age, and numerous large herbivorous caseids are known from the Kungurian of the United States.

Caseasaurs are one of the two synapsid clades known to have survived into the Guadalupian epoch, along with varanopids. Two caseasaur taxa are known from the Guadalupian of Russia, representing the geologically youngest known caseasaurs: the small, possibly omnivorous or insectivorous Phreatophasma, and the large, herbivorous Ennatosaurus.

Classification

Caseasauria is generally regarded as the most basal clade of synapsids, with all other synapsids being grouped in the clade Eupelycosauria. However, not all studies have supported this position. In 2012, Roger Benson argued that most of the characters supporting a basal position for caseasaurs pertained to the skull, and presented a phylogenetic analysis incorporating more postcranial data that resolved a clade comprising ophiacodontids and varanopids as the basalmost synapsid clade. However, new postcranial data from eothyridids and basal caseids established that caseasaurs were more basal than ophiacodontids and varanopids after all, with the characters supporting a more derived position for caseasaurs being the result of convergent evolution between caseids and more derived synapsids. The diadectomorphs, conventionally regarded as anamniote tetrapods, may prove to be synapsids even more basal than Caseasauria.

Most caseasaurs are divided into two families, Eothyrididae and Caseidae. The affinities of the earliest definitive caseasaur, Eocasea, are uncertain, with some phylogenetic analyses finding it to be a caseid and others finding it to be a basal caseasaur belonging to neither family.

Three genera are typically regarded as belonging to the family Eothyrididae: Eothyris, Oedaleops, and Vaughnictis. However, some phylogenetic analyses have failed to resolve the eothyridids as a clade, instead finding them to be paraphyletic with respect to Caseidae. Asaphestera has been provisionally regarded as an eothyridid as well, without being included in a phylogenetic analysis.

The remaining caseasaurs belong to the family Caseidae.

List of species

Paleoecology

The paleoecology of caseids is debated. They are typically interpreted as terrestrial animals of dry, upland habitats. However, Caseids exhibit a similar bone microstructure to cetaceans and pinnipeds, which has led to the hypothesis that they led an aquatic lifestyle. This hypothesis has been challenged on the grounds that their bone microstructure specifically resembles fully pelagic animals, and is unlike the bone microstructure of semiaquatic animals, but that the body plan of caseids is inconsistent with a pelagic lifestyle. Moreover, caseid fossils are predominantly associated with arid upland deposits.

See also
 Evolution of mammals
 Vertebrate paleontology
 Permian tetrapods

References

Bibliography

External links
Palaeos Vertebrates 390.100 Synapsida

 
Pennsylvanian first appearances
Guadalupian extinctions
Taxa named by Samuel Wendell Williston